Jonathan William Woodall, aka Jonnie Woodall MBE (25 January 1946 – 3 April 2009) was a British bobsledder and luger. He competed in the luge at the 1972 Winter Olympics and the bobsleigh at the 1980 Winter Olympics. 

Woodall, who served in the British Army, retired from the army with the rank of Major and became race manager of the British Skeleton Association.

In later life Woodall lived at Mytton, near Montford Bridge in Shropshire. He was killed by being hit by a train on a level crossing whilst out cycling in nearby Eyton Lane, Baschurch.

References

External links
 

1946 births
2009 deaths
British male bobsledders
British male lugers
Olympic bobsledders of Great Britain
Olympic lugers of Great Britain
Bobsledders at the 1980 Winter Olympics
Lugers at the 1972 Winter Olympics
Sportspeople from Oxford
Railway accident deaths in England
Cycling road incident deaths
Road incident deaths in England